Michael Dillon Brosseau (born March 15, 1994) is an American professional baseball infielder for the Milwaukee Brewers of Major League Baseball (MLB). He made his MLB debut in 2019 for the Tampa Bay Rays, and was traded to the Brewers after the 2021 season.

Amateur career
Brosseau attended Andrean High School in Merrillville, Indiana, where he was teammates with Sean Manaea. He attended Oakland University in Rochester Hills, Michigan for four years (2013–2016).

Professional career

Tampa Bay Rays
He was undrafted in 2016 and signed a free agent contract with the Tampa Bay Rays on June 23, 2016. Brosseau’s professional career started with the Gulf Coast League Rays. After an impressive start, Brosseau was promoted to the Bowling Green Hot Rods for the 2017 season, where he led the Midwest League in average (.318) and on-base percentage (.393). Following another impressive stint, he earned a call-up to the Charlotte Stone Crabs of the Florida State League, which is in Class A-Advanced baseball. For the 2018 season, Brosseau played for the Montgomery Biscuits of the Southern League, the Double A affiliate of the Rays. To begin the 2019 season, Brosseau earned promotion to the Rays’ Triple A affiliate, the Durham Bulls. Before being called up to the Majors, Brosseau was leading the Bulls and the International League in RBI with 57.

2019
On June 22, 2019, the Rays selected the contract of Brosseau from Triple-A Durham. On June 23, 2019 Brosseau made his major league debut going 1–5 with a single in his first at-bat. On July 3, 2019 in a 6–9 loss to the Orioles Brosseau recorded his first career home run. On July 13, 2019 Brosseau recorded his first multi-home-run game. On July 22, 2019, Brosseau pitched an inning against the Boston Red Sox, giving up one run in a loss.

2020
On August 15, 2020, Brosseau pitched against the Toronto Blue Jays and recorded his first career strikeout against Randal Grichuk. Offensively, he finished the shortened season hitting .302/.378/.558 with 5 home runs and 12 RBIs in 86 at bats. On September 1, Brosseau was batting against the New York Yankees' Aroldis Chapman when a pitch thrown by Chapman narrowly missed his head. Chapman was suspended three games for the incident, though he denied he had aimed at Brosseau intentionally. Brosseau faced Chapman again in the fifth game of the 2020 American League Division Series, and hit a series-winning home run.

2021
Brosseau spent most of 2021 between the Rays and the Durham Bulls. In 57 games, he batted .187 with five home runs and 18 runs batted in.

Milwaukee Brewers
On November 13, 2021, Brosseau was traded to the Milwaukee Brewers in exchange for pitcher Evan Reifert.

2022 
In 69 games with Milwaukee in 2022, he batted .255/.344/.418 with 6 home runs and 23 RBIs. He bounced around in the field, playing third base in most of his games, but also apperaing at short-stop, 1st base, and pitching 3 times. It was his first season that he didn't make an appearance in the outfield.

References

External links

Oakland Golden Grizzlies bio

1994 births
Living people
People from Munster, Indiana
Baseball players from Indiana
Major League Baseball infielders
Tampa Bay Rays players
Milwaukee Brewers players
Oakland Golden Grizzlies baseball players
Gulf Coast Rays players
Bowling Green Hot Rods players
Charlotte Stone Crabs players
Montgomery Biscuits players
Durham Bulls players
Perth Heat players
American expatriate baseball players in Australia
Wisconsin Timber Rattlers players
Nashville Sounds players